Robert Watts was an Anglican priest in Ireland in the mid Eighteenth century: he was Dean of Ferns from 1740 until 1747  and Dean of Kilkenny in the Diocese of Ossory from 1747 until 1753.

Notes

Alumni of Trinity College Dublin
Deans of Ferns
Deans of Ossory
18th-century Irish Anglican priests
Year of birth missing
Year of death missing